"The House at Pooneil Corners" is a song by the American rock group Jefferson Airplane which first appeared on their album Crown of Creation as the eleventh and final track, and also appears on their album The Roar of Jefferson Airplane alongside the similarly named song "The Ballad of You and Me and Pooneil".

Unlike "The Ballad", "The House At Pooneil Corners" was mainly written by Marty Balin and not Paul Kantner. The song was the only one Jefferson Airplane were able to complete when, while being filmed by Jean-Luc Godard (for his project One A.M., later repurposed and released as One P.M.) performing on the roof of the Schuyler Hotel in New York City in 1968, the police stopped the show. The band also closed their 1969 Woodstock performance with the tune.

Personnel  
 Marty Balin – vocals 
 Grace Slick – vocals
 Paul Kantner – rhythm guitar, vocals 
 Jorma Kaukonen – lead guitar 
 Jack Casady – bass 
 Spencer Dryden – drums

References

 

Jefferson Airplane songs
Songs written by Marty Balin
Song recordings produced by Al Schmitt
1968 songs
Songs written by Paul Kantner